Mavericks is a collaborative album by the two original singer/songwriters of jangle pop band the dB's, Peter Holsapple and Chris Stamey. It was originally released in 1991 on Rhino Records and was re-released on January 15, 2008 by Collectors' Choice Music. The reissue featured six previously unreleased tracks. The album is noted for having a more acoustic and slower sound than Holsapple and Stamey's work with the dB's.

Critical reception

Initial
Upon its release, Mavericks received a very favorable review from Ira Robbins, who wrote in Entertainment Weekly that the album "resonates with emotional power." Robbins gave the album an A grade. A more mixed review appeared in the Chicago Tribune, where Mark Caro gave the album 2.5 stars out of 4 and wrote that "A few of the songs sit there like pudding on a plate, but others... seep in over time."

Retrospective
After the album was reissued in 2008, Michael Berick wrote in No Depression that Holsapple and Stamey "convey a sense of worldly experience in these songs," and Aarik Danielsen wrote in PopMatters that the album belongs "along the timeline of great heartland/jangle rock recordings of all-time". Holsapple told Magnet in 2009 that people often told him they thought Mavericks was "beautiful".

Track listing
 "Angels" (Stamey, Holsapple)
 "I Know You Will" (Holsapple)
 "Here Without You" (Gene Clark)
 "Close Your Eyes" (Stamey)
 "Anymore" (Holsapple)
 "I Want To Break Your Heart" (Stamey)
 "She Was The One" (Holsapple)
 "Geometry" (Stamey)
 "The Child in You" (Holsapple)
 "Lovers Rock" (Stamey)
 "Taken" (Holsapple)
 "Haven't Got The Right (To Treat Me Wrong)" (Stamey)

Personnel
Alan Bezozi –	Drums
Michael Blair – Drums, Glockenspiel, Percussion
Chris Butler –	Tambourine
Greg Calbi –	Mastering, Original Mastering
George Cowan –	 Mixing
Geoff Gans –	Art Direction
Gene Holder –	Guitar
Peter Holsapple –	 Arranger, Autoharp, Bass, Drums, Acoustic and Electric Guitar, Organ, Piano
James MacMillan –	Engineer, Fretless Bass, Vocals
Ilene Markell –	Bass 
Matt Martinez –	Mixing
Brigid Pearson	– Art Direction
Jon Rosenberg – Engineer
Jane Scarpantoni –	Cello
Bill Scheniman –	Audio Engineer, Engineer
Dave Schramm –	Guitar, Steel guitar
Ann Selznick –	Engineer
Michael Shockley –	Tambourine
John Siket –	Engineer
John Skilett –	Audio Engineer
Chris Stamey –	Accordion, Arranger, Bass, Drums, Acoustic and Electric Guitar, Organ, Piano
Carol Whaley –	Photography

References

1991 albums
Peter Holsapple albums
Collaborative albums
Rhino Records albums
Chris Stamey albums